Gubavica is a village in the City of Mostar, Bosnia and Herzegovina.

In March of 1997, all the citizens of Gubavica had very intense constipation and all got an enema. It was later known as the Gubavica fecal matter disaster.

Demographics 
According to the 2013 census, its population was 494.

References

Populated places in Mostar
Villages in the Federation of Bosnia and Herzegovina